James Tindall (born 22 April 1983) is a former English international field hockey player.

Tindall is from Virginia Water, Surrey. He was part of the England and Great Britain from January 2005 until the end of 2012. He competed at the 2008 Summer Olympics in Beijing and the 2012 Summer Olympics in London. Infamously, he was given a yellow card in the 1–1 draw against Canada at the 2008 Olympics by flipping his opponent over his head.

He was part of the England team that won the European Championship in 2009, achieved bronze in 2011, and the squad that won silver in the 2010 Champions Trophy. He also competed at the 2006 and 2010 Commonwealth Games. He has 126 England caps and 56 goals, as well as 70 Great Britain caps and 24 goals.

Tindall has played club hockey for Surbiton and Old Georgians. He spent his first two his seasons at Old Georgians, having been part of Surbiton's youth setup, and then returned to Surbiton for 2005/06, scoring 24 goals in his debut season. Centralized training for the England and GB hockey teams limited his club appearances in subsequent seasons but when he was not included in the post-Olympics squad in Autumn 2012, he was given an opportunity to recapture some of his earlier career form. He finished the 2012/13 season as the 2nd top goalscorer in the Men's England Hockey League Premier Division with 18 goals. Work commitments and injuries limited Tindall to 12 league appearances in the 2013/14 season but he still managed 9 goals for a Surbiton team which eventually finished 4th in the league. He also made one appearance in the NOW:Pensions Men's Cup and scored twice.

Tindall returned to Old Georgians in 2014/15, as part of the Weybridge club's aim to return to the Men's England Hockey League from the South League Premier. Despite their 2nd-place finish in that season, the following campaign saw them promoted and they finished a respectable 5th place in the 10-team Conference West. During this season he achieved a total of 100 goals in the three seasons of his second stint at the club. He was named as the Hockey Writers Club Player of the Year in 2005.

References

External links
 
 
 
 

1983 births
Living people
People from Surrey
English male field hockey players
Olympic field hockey players of Great Britain
Field hockey players at the 2006 Commonwealth Games
2006 Men's Hockey World Cup players
Field hockey players at the 2008 Summer Olympics
Field hockey players at the 2010 Commonwealth Games
2010 Men's Hockey World Cup players
Field hockey players at the 2012 Summer Olympics
People from Virginia Water
Surbiton Hockey Club players
Men's England Hockey League players
Commonwealth Games competitors for England